Servite High School was a coeducational Catholic high school established in Detroit, Michigan, United States in 1949.

References

Educational institutions established in 1949
Educational institutions disestablished in 1987
High schools in Detroit
Defunct Catholic secondary schools in Michigan
1949 establishments in Michigan